Guanyinge Subdistrict is a subdistrict in Shizhong District, Jining, Shandong province, China. , it has 12 residential communities and two villages under its administration.

See also 
 List of township-level divisions of Shandong

References 

Township-level divisions of Shandong
Jining